Ara Babajian (born July 9, 1972) is an American drummer who has been a member of such bands as Leftöver Crack and The Slackers.

Etymology 
Ara is of Armenian descent, and is named after Ara, an Armenian king.

Career 
Together with Dunia Best, Jay Nugent and Alec Baillie he started the third wave ska band Agent 99 in the early nineties. In 1998 they released the compilation album Little Pieces 1993-1995.

In April 2000, Babajian joined Baillie to play drums in Leftöver Crack under the pseudonym "Ara Crack" until 2002. In early 2003 Ara joined The Slackers. In 2005, he rejoined Leftover Crack, though he is no longer an active member. He is also a former member of The World/Inferno Friendship Society.

Ara Babajian has played in a number of other bands, including King Django, Ruder Than You, The Trick Babys, Skandalous All Stars (a ska supergroup featuring several members of the Slackers), and Sic & Mad.

He is an endorser of Pro-Mark Drumsticks

He was also the original drummer of the Star Fucking Hipsters.

During the 80's, Ara also played drums in the  funky-style band Das Booty with Brian Pitts on bass, Matthew Moreno on Horns (for a short time), Michael Cardenas on guitar and James Boyce on vocals.   Demos of this band were to later circulate on YouTube mistakenly as lost Red Hot Chili Peppers recordings.  It was eventually cleared up and credit has been given to Das Booty.

References

External links
[ Allmusic]
Pro-Mark Drumsticks
[ Allmusic Entry]

American people of Armenian descent
Living people
1972 births
20th-century American drummers
American male drummers
21st-century American drummers
20th-century American male musicians
21st-century American male musicians
Leftöver Crack members
Star Fucking Hipsters members
The Slackers members